WVRW (107.7 FM) is a broadcast radio station licensed to Glenville, West Virginia, and serving the Glenville, Grantsville, Burnsville, & Weston area of Central West Virginia.  WVRW is owned and operated by Della Jane Woofter.

External links

VRW